Regards/Ukłony dla Bogusław Schaeffer is a 2022 album by electronic duo Matmos, released through Thrill Jockey on May 20, 2022. It was assembled from a sample pack the duo created of electroacoustic works by Bogusław Schaeffer.

Track listing

References 

2022 albums
Matmos albums
Thrill Jockey albums